Sancho IV of Castile (12 May 1258 – 25 April 1295) called the Brave (el Bravo), was the king of Castile, León and Galicia from 1284 to his death. Following his brother Ferdinand's death, he gained the support of nobles that declared him king instead of Ferdinand's son Alfonso. Faced with revolts throughout his reign, before he died he made his wife regent for his son Ferdinand IV.

Biography
Sancho was the second son of Alfonso X and Yolanda, daughter of James I of Aragon. His elder brother, Ferdinand de la Cerda, died in November 1275. In 1282 Sancho assembled a coalition of nobles to declare for him against Ferdinand's son Alfonso, then took control of the kingdom when Alfonso X died in 1284. This was all against the wishes of their father, but Sancho was crowned in Toledo nevertheless.

Sancho's ascension was in part due to his rejection of his father's elitist politics. Sancho was recognised and supported by the majority of the nobility and the cities, but a sizable minority opposed him throughout his reign and worked for the heirs of Ferdinand de la Cerda. One of the leaders of the opposition was his brother John of Castile, who united to his cause the lord of Biscay, Lope Díaz III de Haro. Sancho responded by executing the Lord of Biscay and incarcerating his brother. According to the chroniclers, he cemented his hold on power by executing 4,000 other followers of Infante Alfonso, son of Ferdinand de la Cerda, in Badajoz. He executed 400 more in Talavera and more in Ávila and Toledo.

Upon dispensing with this opposition, Sancho pardoned his brother, who was released. John bided his time before fomenting revolt again: the conflict over Tarifa. He called in the aid of the Marinids in Morocco and besieged Guzmán the Good in his castle (1291). At this siege occurred that famous act of heroism, the innocent death of the son of Guzmán. Tarifa was faithfully defended until Sancho could rescue it and the Marinids retreated to the Maghreb. The intent of both John and the Sultan of Marinids (to invade) was foiled.

When James II succeeded to the Crown of Aragon, he endeavoured to bind the two crowns more closely and to unite in the Reconquista. Indeed, both of James' predecessors had tried to do likewise. Sancho was also the friend and tutor of Juan Manuel of Castile.

Just before succumbing to a fatal illness (possibly tuberculosis) he appointed his wife, María de Molina, to act as regent for his nine-year-old son, Ferdinand IV. He died on 25 April 1295 in Toledo.

Family
Sancho married Maria de Molina in 1282, but at first their marriage did not have the necessary papal dispensation for two reasons: First, they had a distant blood relation, and second, Sancho had been betrothed as an infant to a rich Catalan heiress named Guillerma Moncada.

They had the following children:
 Isabella (1283–1328). Married first James II of Aragon and secondly John III, Duke of Brittany.
 Ferdinand IV (1285–1312). Married Constance of Portugal.
 Alfonso de Castilla (1286–1291)
 Henry (1288–1299)
 Peter (1290–1319) married Maria daughter of James II of Aragon
 Philip (1292–1327). Married his cousin Margarita de la Cerda, daughter of Alfonso de la Cerda.
 Beatrice (1293–1359). Married Afonso IV of Portugal.

He had three illegitimate children:

By María Alfonso Téllez de Menezes (d. Toro), wife of Juan García, Lord of Ucero:
Violante Sánchez (died bef. 1327), who held the dowry of Ucero as its lady, married in 1293 Fernando Rodríguez de Castro, Lord of Lemos.
Teresa Sánchez, who married Juan Alfonso Téllez de Meneses (died 5 May 1304), a Castilian nobleman, 4th Lord of Alburquerque, who became the 1st Count of Barcelos and was the Mordomo Mor (high steward) of King Denis I of Portugal, and had female issue. After the death of her first husband, she married Ruy Gil de Villalobos, with whom she had one daughter.

By another woman whose name is unknown, he had:
Alfonso Sánchez, who married, as his second wife, María Díaz de Salcedo, but died without issue.

References

Sources

 XXV años de la Escuela de Genealogía, Heráldica y Nobiliaria, Ed. Escuela de Genealogía, Heráldica y Nobiliaria, Hidalguia, 1985.

Castilian House of Burgundy
Castilian infantes
13th-century Leonese monarchs
13th-century Galician monarchs
1258 births
1295 deaths
13th-century Castilian monarchs